Off Da Chain is the debut album by the Atlanta-based rapper Baby D, released in 2000 via Big Oomp Records. It contains collaborations with Lil Jon and YoungBloodz, among others.  "Eastside Vs Westside" was a minor club hit.

Track list

 "Intro"
 "Bow His Azz Up" (feat. Lil Jon & Dollar)
 "Don't Fall" (feat. Loko, Lil' C & Hitman Sammy Sam)
 "Queblo Gold Calls Da Oomp Camp" (skit)
 "Back Up" (feat. Lil' Pete & Gold)
 "My Folk"
 "Like This" (feat. Dollar)
 "Jumpin Down On Em" (feat. YoungBloodZ, Loko & Dollar)
 "Eastside Vs Westside" (feat. Lil' C)
 "Head To Da Club"
 "Ridin In A Chevy" (feat. Lil' C & Swade)
 "Ooh Ooh" (feat. Freddy B & Lil' C)
 "Voicemail" (skit)
 "We Ballin" (feat. Dollar)
 "Why Why" (feat. Crom)
 "Bounce Dat Azz" (feat. Lil' C & Beezelee)

References

2000 debut albums
Baby D (rapper) albums